See entrainment for other types.

In engineering, entrainment is the entrapment of one substance by another substance. For example:

 The entrapment of liquid droplets or solid particulates in a flowing gas, as with smoke.
 The entrapment of gas bubbles or solid particulates in a flowing liquid, as with aeration.
 Given two mutually insoluble liquids, the emulsion of droplets of one liquid into the other liquid, as with margarine.
 Given two gases, the entrapment of one gas into the other gas.
 "Air entrainment" - The intentional entrapment of air bubbles into concrete.
 Entrainment defect in metallurgy, as a result of folded pockets of oxide inside the melt.

See also

 Souders-Brown equation

References

Chemical engineering